"Today I Killed a Man I Didn't Know" was a top 20 hit in New Zealand for singer Nash Chase.

Background
The record was released on the HMV label in June 1971. This was Chase's first release for the label. The single was backed with "World Of Lavender Lace". The single quickly became a hit on the Top 20 chart. It also became a  finalist in the 1971 Loxene Gold Disc awards.

References

1971 singles
1971 songs
Nash Chase songs
Songs written by Roger Greenaway
Songs written by Roger Cook (songwriter)